Ruda may refer to:

Islands
 Ruda (island), Croatian island in the Elaphiti Archipelago

Rivers
 Ruda (river), a river in Croatia, tributary of the Cetina river
 Ruda (Narew), a river in Poland, tributary of the Narew
 Ruda (Oder), a river in Poland, tributary of the Oder
 Ruda, a river in Romania, tributary of the Râul Târgului
 Ruda (Suceava), a river in Romania, tributary of the Suceava river
 Ruda, a river in Romania, tributary of the Luncoiu
 Ruda (Teteriv), a river in Ukraine, tributary of the Teteriv

Settlements

Bosnia and Herzegovina
Ruda, Novi Travnik, a village in Novi Travnik

Croatia
Ruda, a village in Otok, Split-Dalmatia County

Czech Republic
Ruda (Rakovník District), a municipality and village in the Central Bohemian Region
Ruda (Žďár nad Sázavou District), a municipality and village in the Vysočina Region
Ruda nad Moravou, a municipality and village in the Olomouc Region
Ruda, a village and part of Krouna in the Pardubice Region
Ruda, a village and part of Tvrdkov in the Moravian-Silesian Region

Italy
Ruda, Italy, a municipality

Poland
Ruda Śląska, a town in southern Poland
Ruda, Gidle, a village in Łódź Voivodeship (central Poland)
Ruda, Grudziądz County in Kuyavian-Pomeranian Voivodeship (north-central Poland)
Ruda, Gmina Skrwilno in Kuyavian-Pomeranian Voivodeship (north-central Poland)
Ruda, Włocławek County in Kuyavian-Pomeranian Voivodeship (north-central Poland)
Ruda, Gmina Rogowo in Kuyavian-Pomeranian Voivodeship (north-central Poland)
Ruda, Chełm County in Lublin Voivodeship (east Poland)
Ruda, Janów Lubelski County in Lublin Voivodeship (east Poland)
Ruda, Białystok County in Podlaskie Voivodeship (north-east Poland)
Ruda, Grajewo County in Podlaskie Voivodeship (north-east Poland)
Ruda, Mońki County in Podlaskie Voivodeship (north-east Poland)
Ruda, Łask County in Łódź Voivodeship (central Poland)
Ruda, Gmina Dobryszyce in Łódź Voivodeship (central Poland)
Ruda, Gmina Gidle in Łódź Voivodeship (central Poland)
Ruda, Sieradz County in Łódź Voivodeship (central Poland)
Ruda, Skierniewice County in Łódź Voivodeship (central Poland)
Ruda, Wieluń County in Łódź Voivodeship (central Poland)
Ruda, Gmina Krzywda in Lublin Voivodeship (east Poland)
Ruda, Gmina Serokomla in Lublin Voivodeship (east Poland)
Ruda, Gmina Stoczek Łukowski in Lublin Voivodeship (east Poland)
Ruda, Busko County in Świętokrzyskie Voivodeship (south-central Poland)
Ruda, Kielce County in Świętokrzyskie Voivodeship (south-central Poland)
Ruda, Mielec County in Subcarpathian Voivodeship (south-east Poland)
Ruda, Ropczyce-Sędziszów County in Subcarpathian Voivodeship (south-east Poland)
Ruda, Starachowice County in Świętokrzyskie Voivodeship (south-central Poland)
Ruda, Staszów County in Świętokrzyskie Voivodeship (south-central Poland)
Ruda, Stalowa Wola County in Subcarpathian Voivodeship (south-east Poland)
Ruda, Garwolin County in Masovian Voivodeship (east-central Poland)
Ruda, Kozienice County in Masovian Voivodeship (east-central Poland)
Ruda, Mińsk County in Masovian Voivodeship (east-central Poland)
Ruda, Mława County in Masovian Voivodeship (east-central Poland)
Ruda, Ostrów Mazowiecka County in Masovian Voivodeship (east-central Poland)
Ruda, Piaseczno County in Masovian Voivodeship (east-central Poland)
Ruda, Siedlce County in Masovian Voivodeship (east-central Poland)
Ruda, Wołomin County in Masovian Voivodeship (east-central Poland)
Ruda, Gmina Kazanów in Masovian Voivodeship (east-central Poland)
Ruda, Gmina Przyłęk in Masovian Voivodeship (east-central Poland)
Ruda, Żuromin County in Masovian Voivodeship (east-central Poland)
Ruda, Krotoszyn County in Greater Poland Voivodeship (west-central Poland)
Ruda, Oborniki County in Greater Poland Voivodeship (west-central Poland)
Ruda, Piła County in Greater Poland Voivodeship (west-central Poland)
Ruda, Pleszew County in Greater Poland Voivodeship (west-central Poland)
Ruda, Turek County in Greater Poland Voivodeship (west-central Poland)
Ruda, Silesian Voivodeship (south Poland)
Ruda, Pomeranian Voivodeship (north Poland)
Ruda, Giżycko County in Warmian-Masurian Voivodeship (north Poland)
Ruda, Pisz County in Warmian-Masurian Voivodeship (north Poland)

Romania
Ruda, a village in Ghelari Commune, Hunedoara County
Ruda, a village in Budeşti Commune, Vâlcea County
Ruda, the Hungarian name for Ruda-Brad village, Brad city, Hunedoara County

Serbia
Ruđa, a village in the municipality of Tutin

Sweden
Ruda, Sweden, a locality

Other uses
 Ruda (deity), worshipped among the North Arabian tribes of pre-Islamic Arabia
 Ruda (sheep), a breed of sheep from Albania

See also